Frederick Lloyd Young (May 27, 1903 – July 10, 1978) was an American football player. He played college football for Macalester College and the University of North Dakota and at the guard, center, tackle, and end positions in the National Football League (NFL) for the Providence Steam Roller from 1925 to 1927 and the Minneapolis Red Jackets from 1929 to 1930. He appeared in 35 NFL games, 24 as a starter.

References

1903 births
1978 deaths
Providence Steam Roller players
Minneapolis Red Jackets players
Players of American football from Minnesota